Allan A. Moss (December 3, 1854 – 1929), referred to as A. A. Moss, was the mayor of Newport News, Virginia. He is the only person to date to have served two nonconsecutive terms. His first span of office covered three two-year terms, from September 1, 1898, to September 1, 1904. By 1916, the term in office was extended to four years, and he served again from September 1 of that year to September 1, 1920. His terms saw continued growth of the city in its early state (having only been incorporated as an independent city in 1896). He presided over the dedication of the Newport News Victory Arch in 1919.

Mayors of Newport News, Virginia
1854 births
1929 deaths
20th-century American politicians